Frederik Maurits van der Wulp (13  December 1818, The Hague – 27 November 1899, The Hague) was a Dutch entomologist mainly interested in Diptera.

He was a civil servant in the Dutch Audit Office.

His collection is divided between Natura Artis Magistra in Amsterdam and Rijksmuseum van Natuurlijke Historie in Leiden.

Frederik van der Wulp was a Member of the Netherlands Entomological Society.

Works
with Samuel Constantinus Snellen van Vollenhoven the first checklist entirely  devoted to Dutch Diptera in the following parts
Wulp, F.M. van der, & S.C. Snellen van Vollenhoven, 1852. Naamlijst van inlandsche Diptera. I. In: Bouwstoffen voor eene fauna van Nederland Deel 1 (J.A. Herklots, ed.): 138–153. E.J. Brill, Leiden.
Wulp, F.M. van der & S.C. Snellen van Vollenhoven, 1853. Naamlijst van inlandsche Diptera. II. In: Bouwstoffen voor eene fauna van Nederland Deel 1. (J.A. Herklots (ed.): 188–206, E.J. Brill, Leiden.
Wulp, F.M. van der, & S.C. Snellen van Vollenhoven, 1856. Naamlijst van inlandsche Diptera. III. In: Bouwstoffen voor eene fauna van Nederland. Deel 2. (J.A. Herklots, ed.): 89-117. E.J. Brill, Leiden. 
1877 Diptera Neerlandica : de tweevleugelige insecten van Nederland 'S Gravenhage : Martinus Nijhoff  online
1888-1903. Diptera Volume 2 in Biologia Centrali-Americana. Insecta. London, Quaritch.online
1896 Catalogue of the described Diptera from South Asia. The Hague, M. Nijhoff online

References

Evenhuis, N. L., 1997 Litteratura taxonomica dipterorum (1758-1930). Volume 1 (A-K); Volume 2 (L-Z). - Leiden, Backhuys Publishers 1; 2 : VII+1-426; 427-871 pages 831–832, Portrait. 
Menzel, F.; Mohrig, W., 2000 Revision der paläarktischen Trauermücken (Diptera: Sciaridae). - Studia dipterologica Supplement, Halle/Saale 6[1999] : 1–761, 612 figs. 1 page 10  (only portrait)
papers on exotic Diptera in Tijdschrift voor Entomologie

External links
ITIS taxa described by Wulp

1818 births
1899 deaths
Dutch entomologists
Dipterists
 01
Dutch taxonomists
19th-century Dutch zoologists
Scientists from The Hague